Mandakuli is a small village in Kudal in Sindhudurg district, Maharashtra, India. It is situated on Karli River in southwest Maharashtara. Mandakuli comes in Kudal taluka.

Geography
It has an average elevation of 20 metres (65 feet). The climate is mostly coastal And humid.
annual temperature rises from 22 to 40 degree Celsius.
Mandakuli gets very heavy rainfall of 1100mm per year.

Temples in Mandakuli
Lingeshwar Temple - 
This temple is of Lord Shiva.

Pawanaai Temple -

Maruti Temple -

Villages in Sindhudurg district